Emil Elestianto Dardak (born 20 May 1984) is an Indonesian politician who is the Vice Governor of East Java. Before becoming Vice Governor, he was the regent of Trenggalek Regency between 2016 and 2019 and was a singer cum actor prior to his political career.

Early life and education
Emil Dardak was born in Jakarta on 20 May 1984 as the eldest children of four siblings to an ethnic Javanese family hailing from Trenggalek, East Java province. Dardak studied at Singapore's Raffles Institution and later for his undergraduate degree at the University of New South Wales and he eventually completed his formal education after graduating with a doctorate from Ritsumeikan Asia Pacific University. In addition, Dardak participated in the 2018 class of the Bloomberg Harvard City Leadership Initiative, being the only Indonesian between the 40 mayors involved.

Career
By 2012, Dardak had been appointed as executive vice president of the state-owned company PT Penjaminan Infrastruktur Indonesia.

Dardak registered in 2015 to run in Trenggalek's regency election with the 25-year old Muhammad Nur Arifin as running mate, with the support of PDI-P, Gerindra, Golkar, PAN, Demokrat, Hanura and PPP. The pair won 76 percent of the votes (282,487), winning in all of Trenggalek's subdistricts. The pair was sworn in on 17 February 2016.

After being regent, Dardak attempted to diversify the economy of Trenggalek, promoting tourism and encouraging investment programs in the area - which typically sees less investors than regencies in northern Java. He later became running mate to Khofifah Indar Parawansa in the 2018 East Java gubernatorial election, and the pair won with 10,465,218 votes (53.55%). The pair was sworn in on 13 February 2019.

Dardak is a member of the Democratic Party, although he endorsed Joko Widodo in the 2019 Indonesian presidential election - against party lines.

Family
Dardak's father, Hermanto Dardak (1957-2019), was deputy minister of public works under Susilo Bambang Yudhoyono's presidency and in 2015 served as head of regional development in the same ministry. Emil is married to a fellow actress , who was of mixed Indo Eurasian-Malay descent from Palembang, South Sumatra.

References

1984 births
Javanese people
Indonesian singers
Vice Governors of East Java
Indonesian actors
Politicians from Jakarta
Democratic Party (Indonesia) politicians
Living people
Mayors and regents of places in East Java
Vice Governors of Indonesian provinces
Raffles Institution alumni
Ritsumeikan Asia Pacific University alumni
University of New South Wales alumni